Edward R. Lovelady (24 June 1898 - after 1925) was an English professional footballer who played as an inside right. He made appearances in the English Football League for Wrexham. He also played for Bangor City, Marine and Winsford United.

References

1898 births
Date of death unknown
English footballers
Association football midfielders
English Football League players
Bangor City F.C. players
Wrexham A.F.C. players
Marine F.C. players
Winsford United F.C. players